The Hermannsburg Mission Seminary  is a seminary in Hermannsburg, Germany. It is part of the Evangelical-Lutheran Mission in Lower Saxony (ELM), the common missionary work of the state churches of Hanover, Brunswick and Schaumburg-Lippe.

History 
The mission seminary in Hermannsburg was founded in 1849 by pastor Ludwig Harms, after several young men from  Hermannsburg and the surrounding area expressed the wish to be sent out as missionaries and would not be accepted by the existing missionary societies because, as farmers and agricultural workers, they did not have the necessary academic education. So the Hermannsburg Mission began as a "farmers' mission" (Bauernmission).

Having qualified, The first "pupils" were sent overseas in 1854 and founded the work of the Hermannsburg Mission in South Africa, where the Evangelical-Lutheran Mission in Lower Saxony (ELM) is still active today.

Even after the Second World War, spiritual impulses went out from the mission seminary under seminary leader, Olav Hanssen.

Between 1979 and 1993 the seminary was led by Dietrich Mann.

Description
Male and female pastors are trained at the seminary. After six to seven years, they are eligible for service in the worldwide church.

Notable graduates 
 Reinhard Keding (born 1948), former bishop of the Evangelical Lutheran Church in Namibia (DELK)
 Erich Hertel (born 1949), bishop of the Evangelical Lutheran Church in Namibia (DELK)

See also
Hermannsburg School, South Africa
Hermannsburg Mission House, owned by the school

External links 
 Homepage of the mission seminary 
 Homepage of the Evangelical-Lutheran  Mission in Lower Saxony 
 Homepage of the Ev. Gethsemane Abbey of Riechenberg 

Christian missionary societies
Seminaries and theological colleges in Germany
Lutheran seminaries
Religious organizations established in 1849
Lutheranism in Germany
Christianity in Lower Saxony
1849 establishments in the Kingdom of Hanover
Lutheran universities and colleges in Europe